BQU may refer to:

 Bhattiprolu railway station (by station code)
 Blue Quills University, the short name of University nuhelot’įne thaiyots’į nistameyimâkanak Blue Quills
 Guru language (by ISO 639-3 language code)
 J. F. Mitchell Airport (by IATA airport code)